John Carter Rose (April 27, 1861 – March 26, 1927) was a United States circuit judge of the United States Court of Appeals for the Fourth Circuit and previously was a United States district judge of the United States District Court for the District of Maryland.

Education and career

Born in Baltimore, Maryland, Rose received a Bachelor of Laws from the University of Maryland School of Law in 1882 and entered private practice in Baltimore. He also worked as an editorial writer for the Baltimore Sun. He was a supervisor of the 1890 United States Census in Baltimore. He was the United States Attorney for the District of Maryland from 1898 to 1910.

Federal judicial service

Rose was nominated by President William Howard Taft on March 25, 1910, to the United States District Court for the District of Maryland, to a new seat authorized by 36 Stat. 201. He was confirmed by the United States Senate on April 4, 1910, and received his commission the same day. His service terminated on December 26, 1922, due to his elevation to the Fourth Circuit.

Rose was nominated by President Warren G. Harding on December 9, 1922, to the United States Court of Appeals for the Fourth Circuit, to a new seat authorized by 42 Stat. 837. He was confirmed by the Senate on December 20, 1922, and received his commission the same day. His service terminated on March 26, 1927, due to his death in Atlantic City, New Jersey.

References

Sources
 

1861 births
1927 deaths
United States Attorneys for the District of Maryland
Judges of the United States District Court for the District of Maryland
United States district court judges appointed by William Howard Taft
20th-century American judges
Judges of the United States Court of Appeals for the Fourth Circuit
United States court of appeals judges appointed by Warren G. Harding